The 1999 China Open (also known as the 1999 China International) was a professional ranking snooker tournament that took place between 11 and 19 December 1999 at the Beijing University Students' Gymnasium in Beijing, China. The tournament was the fourth ranking event out of the 1999/2000 season.

The defending champion was John Higgins, but he was eliminated in the first round, losing 1–5 against Peter Lines.

Ronnie O'Sullivan won the tournament by defeating Stephen Lee 9–2 in the final.

Wildcard round

Main draw

Final

References

1999 (2)
China Open
Open (snooker)
Sports competitions in Beijing